D6 motorway, formerly Expressway R6 is a highway in the Czech Republic. When completed it will go from Prague through Karlovy Vary and Cheb to the border with Germany. Its first segment was opened in 1980s.

  of the highway is in operation. Another  is under construction.

Under construction

Images 

R06
Proposed roads in the Czech Republic